Saurodon (from  , 'lizard' and   'tooth')  is an extinct genus of ichthyodectiform fish from the Cretaceous.

Saurodon leanus is known to occur as early as the late Coniacian through the Santonian, in the Late Cretaceous.

Species

 Saurodon elongatus  Taverne & Bronzi, 1999
 'Saurodon' intermedius  Newton, 1878 
 Saurodon leanus  Hays, 1830

Sources
 Fishes of the World by Joseph S. Nelson

References

External links
 

Ichthyodectiformes
Late Cretaceous fish of North America
Fossil taxa described in 1830
Mooreville Chalk